Eric Gerald Bullock (born February 16, 1960) is an American former professional baseball outfielder, who played in Major League Baseball (MLB) for the Houston Astros, Minnesota Twins, Philadelphia Phillies, and Montreal Expos, from  to .

External links

Eric Bullock at Baseball Almanac
Eric Bullock at Baseball Gauge
Eric Bullock at Astros Daily
 Eric Bullock at Pura Pelota (Venezuelan Professional Baseball League)

1950 births
Living people
African-American baseball players
American expatriate baseball players in Canada
American expatriate baseball players in Mexico
Basketball players from Los Angeles
Columbus Astros players
Daytona Beach Astros players
Gulf Coast Astros players
Houston Astros players
Indianapolis Indians players
Las Vegas Stars (baseball) players
Leones del Caracas players
Louisburg Hurricanes baseball players
Los Angeles Harbor Seahawks baseball players
Major League Baseball outfielders
Minnesota Twins players
Montreal Expos players
Navegantes del Magallanes players
American expatriate baseball players in Venezuela
Norfolk Tides players
Philadelphia Phillies players
Portland Beavers players
Rojos del Águila de Veracruz players
Scranton/Wilkes-Barre Red Barons players
Tucson Toros players
21st-century African-American people
20th-century African-American sportspeople